The Baltimore City College football team, known as the "Black Knights" or the "Knights" since 1950, or longtime since the 1880s as the "Collegians" or since 1928 as the "Alamedans", represents the Baltimore City College, a public college preparatory secondary school featuring the International Baccalaureate programme, in Baltimore, Maryland, U.S. Since the introduction of football at the school in the mid-1870s, the City College football team has competed in more than 1,000 contests, won more than 20 Maryland Scholastic Association (MSA) and Baltimore City championships, while emphasizing academics and character education.

In 1889, City's primary rivalry started when the first game was played between Baltimore City College and the Baltimore Manual Training School, which was later renamed the Baltimore Polytechnic Institute (Poly). Six former City College football players have gone on to professional careers in the National Football League (NFL). Two City College coaches have advanced to higher levels as well. George Young served in the NFL as the general manager of the New York Giants from 1979 to 1997 and served as an assistant coach with the Baltimore Colts and the Miami Dolphins. Another coach, Harry Lawrence established a winning tradition at Bucknell University.

Overview

History

In the mid-1870s, the popularity of football spread to high school competition. City College became one of the first high schools in the Baltimore-area to play football, which meant that there were no organized teams at the same level. In 1895, therefore, City scheduled games against college teams such as the Maryland, the Naval Academy, Mount St. Mary's, Western Maryland and even the Fort Monroe soldiers. The record in 1895: 3 wins, 13 losses, including a 42–0 rout by Navy. In the first game of the 1896 season, Gettysburg College trounced City 50–0, but enthusiasm for the team continued to grow as evidence by the send off given them before they sailed to Hampton, Virginia to play Hampton high school.  By the early 1900s, area high schools had developed football teams and City was able to compete on a more level playing field, beating, for instance, the newly formed Polytechnic team 13–0 in 1903.

Little is known about the first City–Poly game, except that it was played at northeast Baltimore's  Clifton Park in 1889 between the City "reserves" team and Poly with City emerging as the victor.  City won all 12 games from 1889 to 1900 when the annual clash was considered a scrub engagement. The annual meeting of the two teams has led to one of the longest continuous public high school football rivalries in the nation. By 1918, Poly and other area schools had surpassed City in their preparation for the games.  According to William Tippett, Jr, class of 1919, City's team did not even have a practice field because of its location in Downtown Baltimore.

The Harry Lawrence era
By 1929, the Knights had a new $3 million,  home in northeast Baltimore. That same year the Knights wore new uniforms with numbers on the front and back, a historic first for high schools. The "Castle on the Hill" had spacious practice fields with a separate "game day field".

Under head coach Harry Lawrence, the Knights dominated local teams, including Poly whom they beat consecutively from 1934 to 1942; and started playing schools out of state, beating Petersburg High School in 1936. The 1936 team won all nine of its games, but was stripped of the MSA title when one of running back Arthur Deckleman was ruled ineligible.  The investigating committee gave the title to the McDonough High School, which City had beaten, 12–0, during the regular season.

By 1940, Lawrence's teams were undefeated in 38 consecutive games, won three consecutive state titles and retired the trophy presented by the Evening Sun for the winner of the City-Poly game.  In 1941, an undefeated City College went to Florida, to play Miami High School in the Orange Bowl stadium. The Knights, used to playing in cool autumnal or cold winter weather, lost to Miami High with the temperature exceeding 90 °F. After the season, Lawrence and his long-time assistant, Otts Helms joined the war effort; Helms was a captain in the Army and Lawrence served as a lieutenant in the Navy for the remainder of World War II. In 1947, Lawrence became the head coach at Bucknell University where future City College head football coach, George Young, played for him in the early 1950s.

Andy Defassio was hired as the head coach in 1950, his assistant coach that first year was Robert Lumsden.  Lumsden soon left to take over the head coaching duties at Poly, under its legendary coach Bob Lumsden, dominated City and Maryland football during the 1950s with City unable to win any of the rivalry games during that decade.

The George Young era
The trend would reverse again as George Young took over the coaching duties in 1959. Young had actually been a history teacher at City, but an assistant coach at rival Calvert Hall College. Young brought discipline back to the practice field and an emphasis on grades. He also brought in young aggressive special teams coaches Joe Brune, Bob Patzwall, Mel Filler, and Ed Novak; all of whom would become head coaches later in their careers with Brune coaching the Loyola Dons for more than 25 years.

Young's summer camps were brutal with an emphasis on running and conditioning as opposed to tackling and kicking. Young's teams won 6 of the 8 games he coached against Poly during the 1960s and six MSA championships.  One of the most memorable City–Poly games occurred on Thanksgiving Day 1965, at Baltimore's Memorial Stadium, with some 25,000 fans and alumni in attendance. City beat Poly 52–6, and completed a 10–0 season with the team being ranked eighth in the nation by a national sports poll.  The 52 points scored by City are the most points scored by either team during the rivalry. Two Knights from that game, Sykes and Person went on to the National Football League; former Baltimore Mayor Kurt Schmoke was the quarterback and Maryland Delegate Curt Anderson was the captain of that team.

The tradition of the game being played on Thanksgiving ended in 1992 when Baltimore City public schools sports programs moved to the Maryland Public Secondary Schools Athletic Association (MPSSAA).  Football playoffs for the MPSSAA generally start in the second week of November.  The City-Poly game is now played the first week of November at the home of the Baltimore Ravens, M&T Bank Stadium, in downtown Baltimore.

The George Petrides era

George Petrides, a 1967 City College graduate, served as head football coach from 1975 until he retired in 2015. His 40-year tenure was longer than the previous 10 coaches combined. During the 1960s, Petrides played on City College teams that never lost a game, but at the beginning of his coaching career, he was faced with almost impossible circumstances. The City College main academic building was being renovated forcing enrollment to plummet and the student body to take courses at the old Poly building on North Avenue in midtown Baltimore. The athletic practice field was two miles (3 km) away, and in 1979 Petrides was forced to use his junior varsity team to play Poly's varsity because of the dwindling enrollment. The Castle on the Hill reopened in 1978 but the Knights did not manage a win against Poly again until 1987.

During the 1990s, a rebirth of City College football dominance occurred. During that time, Petrides and his top assistant coach Angelo Geppi led the team through a 29-game winning streak, the longest consecutive winning streak in the history of Maryland high school football. Petrides and Geppi also led the team to two consecutive MSA-A Conference championships in 1991 and 1992.

In 1993, Baltimore City Schools withdrew from the MSA to join the other public schools in the state in the Maryland Public Secondary Schools Athletic Association (MPSSAA). 
The move meant that City College could compete in a statewide play-off system and perhaps earn a state championship, but because of scheduling conflicts with the state playoffs, City would have to hold its traditional game against Poly three weeks before Thanksgiving.

On September 11, 2006, Petrides was honored as the Baltimore Ravens High School Coach of the Week for the third time. Less than a month later, City and Poly clashed in the 118th City–Poly football game. Petrides' Black Knights beat Poly 44–8, won the Baltimore City championship, and finished the 2006 season 11–1, but lost the Maryland state class 3A North championship game, 7–6.

On August 5, 2015, Petrides announced that he was retiring as the head football coach. During his 40 years at the helm of the football program, Petrides' teams racked up 257 wins, 141 losses, and one tie. Petrides' teams won five Maryland Scholastic Association championships and two Baltimore City Division I titles. He led the Knights to perfect seasons in 1987, 1991 and 1992.

Varsity head coaches

The following men served as head coaches during the years specified.

Hay Eichelberger 1904-1907
Captain Steinbacker 1908-1909
D. Claude Stonecipher 1910-1911
Harry (Dutch) Ruhle 1912-1914
Michael J. Thompson 1915-1916
Ferdinand Bonnette 1917
Herb Armstrong 1918
John Coulbourn 1919-1921
Chester H. Katenkamp 1922
Henry "Pop" Goodard 1923-1928
Vic Schmid 1929-1930
David Kaufman 1931-1933
Harry Lawrence 1934-1941
Charles Hirschauer 1942-1944
Charley Rudo 1945
Harry Lawrence 1946
Otts Helms 1947-1949
Andy Defassio 1950-1951
Otts Helm 1952-1953
Frank Lee 1954-1958
George Young 1959-1967
Robert Patzwall 1968
Robert Terpening 1969-1970
Ron Chartrand 1971-1974
George Petrides 1975–2015
Daryl Wade 2015–2017
Mike Hamilton 2017-2019
Rodney Joyner 2020-

Players in the NFL
Over the years,7 City College football players have gone on to play in the National Football League:
Bob Baldwin, class of 1962 (Baltimore Colts),
Ara Person, class of 1966 (St. Louis Cardinals), 
John Sykes, class of 1967 (San Diego Chargers), 
Tom Gatewood, class of 1968 (New York Giants), 
Bryant Johnson, class of 1999 (Arizona Cardinals, San Francisco 49ers, Detroit Lions)
Adrian Coxson, class of 2010 (Green Bay Packers)
Charles Tapper, class of 2012 (New York Jets)

Past seasons results, standings

City-Poly rivalry 

The City–Poly football rivalry is the oldest American football rivalry in Maryland and one of the oldest public school rivalries in the U.S.—predated by the rivalry between the Boston Latin School and the English High School of Boston.  The rivalry began in 1889, when  a dominant team from Baltimore City College (City) met a team from the Baltimore Polytechnic Institute (Poly), and has continued annually.  On Nov. 2, 2019 City beat Poly 10-6 and now leads the series: 63-62-6.

Early years
Little is known of the first American football game between Baltimore Polytechnic Institute (Poly) and Baltimore City College (City) in 1889, except that a JV team from Poly met City, in Clifton Park and City emerged the victor.  City continued to win against Poly through 1901, however in 1902, for the only time in history of the series no game was played; though, in 1931, an extra game was played to compensate.  Between 1903 and 1906, City won the series, but the tide turned in 1907, when the first tie in the series occurred.  The next year Poly scored its first victory in the rivalry.

1910s and 1920s
Poly dominated the series in the 1910s.  The only year of the decade that City won was 1912, and between 1914 and 1917, Poly shut out City. Poly's streak continued through 1921, completing a nine-year winning streak, which City broke in 1922 with a 27–0 victory.

In 1926, one of the most famous City-Poly games was played.  Prior to the game, the eligibility of City's halfback, Mickey Noonen, was challenged.  A committee was formed to investigate Noonen's eligibility, but Noonen's father—frustrated with the investigation—struck one of the members of the committee.  The result was that Noonen was not only barred from the team, but also expelled from the Baltimore City school system.  In spite of Noonen's removal, the two teams met at the Baltimore Stadium with 20,000 fans in attendance.  The game remained scoreless well into the fourth quarter.  Finally, Poly's Harry Lawerence—who later became a coach at City—kicked a successful field goal from the 30 yard leading to a 3–0 victory over City.

1930s and 1940s

The 1930s ushered in a period of resurgence for the City team.  Poly, which had dominated in the previous two decades, only picked up two wins in the 1930s.  In 1934, Harry Lawrence, who had kicked the winning field goal against City in 1926, became the head coach at his former rival.  Lawrence led City to a series of victories over Poly through the 1930s and early 1940s.  In 1944, the game, which had been played on the Saturday following Thanksgiving, was moved to Thanksgiving Day.  The change was the result of a scheduling conflict with the Army–Navy Game.  The game remained on Thanksgiving Day for nearly 50 years.

Lumsden and Young: 1950s and 1960s
In the 1950s, Poly under its legendary coach, Bob Lumsden for whom Poly's football stadium is named, won five straight games against City and won 9 out of the 10 games of the decade.  Lumsden finished with 11–7 record against City, when he retired as head coach at Poly in 1966.  In 1962, Lumsden coached 9-0 Poly to the unofficial National High School Championship Game at the Orange Bowl in Miami against the Miami High Stingarees. Miami defeated the Engineers by a score of 19–7. However, Poly's fortunes changed in the 1960s, while City was coached by George Young.  Young coached his teams to six wins over Poly and as many Maryland Scholastic Association championships.  One of Young's most memorable victories occurred on Thanksgiving Day 1965 at Memorial Stadium, when undefeated City beat undefeated Poly 52–6.

1970s–present
Throughout the 1970s and well into the 1980s, Poly controlled the series.  City lost a total of 17 consecutive games to Poly, before winning in 1987.  Poly's dominance during this period is the longest winning streak in the series.  In 1993, the Baltimore City public schools withdrew from the Maryland Scholastic Athletic association and joined the Maryland Public Secondary Schools Athletic Association (MPSSAA). This change meant that the football season would end earlier forcing Poly and City to move their game from Thanksgiving Day to the first Saturday in November.

Notes

References

Baltimore City College
American football teams in Baltimore
High school football in the United States